Ansoxetine is the trade name of a type of antidepressant medication. It was never marketed.

References 

Dimethylamino compounds
Antidepressants
Flavones
Hydroquinone ethers
Abandoned drugs